The 2013–14 Elitserien was the 80th season of the top division of Swedish handball. 14 teams competed in the league. The eight highest placed teams qualified for the playoffs, whereas teams 11–13 had to play relegation playoffs against teams from the second division, and team 14 was relegated automatically. Eskilstuna Guif won the regular season, but Alingsås HK won the playoffs and claimed their second Swedish title.

League table

Playoffs bracket

Attendance

References 

Swedish handball competitions